"Stone Cold" is a song by Australian rock musician, Jimmy Barnes. It was released in May 1993 as the third single from Barnes' sixth studio album, Heat.

Details
The song was the first time that Barnes had collaborated with former members of Cold Chisel since the band's demise. He said, "When Ian Moss played guitar on it in the studio, it was all so Chisel-esque that it made the hairs stand up on the back of our necks when we played it back. You tend to forget how great a songwriter Don Walker is until you sing his songs."

Don Walker had been the main songwriter in Cold Chisel, and Barnes had requested his contribution. Barnes said, "Now, let me clarify that it wasn't exactly the first time. I had asked Don for help in the past but he hadn't responded."

Lyrics
"Stone Cold" is a blues rock love song, which sees the singer returning home drunk (or 'stoned') to his lover, telling her he's "stoned... stone cold in love with you"

Track listing
 CD Single
 Stone Cold 3:46
 Stone Cold (Live) 4:18
 Wheels in Motion 3:20

 CD/ Cassette Maxi 
 Stone Cold
 Stand Up (Live)
 Stone Cold (Live)
 Catch Your Shadow (Acoustic)
 Stone Cold (Acoustic)
 Working Class Man (Acoustic)

Charts

Weekly charts

Year-end charts

Sales and certifications

References

Mushroom Records singles
1993 singles
1993 songs
Jimmy Barnes songs
Song recordings produced by Don Gehman
Songs written by Don Walker (musician)